Presidential elections were held in Liberia in May 1869. The result was a victory for Edward James Roye of the True Whig Party, defeating incumbent President James Spriggs Payne. The election was very close, with the House of Representatives required to decide the final outcome. 

Roye took office on 3 January 1870.

References

Liberia
1869 in Liberia
Elections in Liberia
May 1869 events
Election and referendum articles with incomplete results